Ocampo  is one of the 39 municipalities of Durango, in north-western Mexico. The municipal seat lies at Villa Ocampo. The municipality covers an area of 3,207.7 km².

As of 2010, the municipality had a total population of 9,626, up from 9,222 as of 2005. 

The municipality had 196 localities, the largest of which (with 2010 populations in parentheses) were: Villa las Nieves (3,079) and Villa Ocampo (1,076), classified as urban.

References

Municipalities of Durango